Great Rehabilitation Centre of the National Narcotics Board of Indonesia (abbreviated as Babesrehab) is a drug rehabilitation centre located in Bogor Regency, West Java, Indonesia. The centre, managed by the National Narcotics Board, was inaugurated by Tien Soeharto on 31 October 1974. The rehabilitation centre service is using one stop centre system, which is composed by medical rehabilitation services and social rehabilitation under one roof. This rehabilitation centre service using the Therapeutic Community (TC) with a capacity of 500 persons, and lasted for 6 months.

References

Therapeutic community
Medical and health organizations based in Indonesia